Ypsilanti Township is one of the sixty-two townships of Stutsman County, North Dakota, United States. The population was 160 at the 2020 census. The median household income was $29,444.

History

The United States Government granted 621 acres of land to the Northern Pacific Railroad in 1879. Part of this land became Ypsilanti Township and the Ypsilanti townsite. The town and township were named for Ypsilanti, Michigan.

References

External links
 County Township Layout
 Ypsilanti, North Dakota 58497

Townships in Stutsman County, North Dakota
Townships in North Dakota